Graignamanagh GAA is a Gaelic Athletic Association club in the village of Graiguenamanagh, County Kilkenny, Ireland. The club fields teams in hurling and Gaelic football.

History

Graignamanagh GAA club was founded under the name St. Vincent's in 1953. Prior to this the Graiguenamanagh area had been served by three clubs: Brandon Rovers, Blacks and Whites and Tinnahinch. The St. Vincent's name was dropped in favour of Graignamanagh in 1967.

Honours

Kilkenny Senior Football Championship: 1956
Kilkenny Intermediate Hurling Championship: 1976, 1980, 1985
Kilkenny Junior Hurling Championship: 1972

References

External link

 Graignamanagh GAA club website

Gaelic games clubs in County Kilkenny
Hurling clubs in County Kilkenny
Gaelic football clubs in County Kilkenny